Rhododendron longipes (长柄杜鹃) is a rhododendron species native to Chongqing, eastern Guizhou, southwestern Sichuan, and northeastern Yunnan in China, where it grows at altitudes of 1700–2500 meters. It is a shrub or small tree that grows to 2–4 meters in height, with leathery leaves that are elliptic or elliptic-lanceolate, and 5–13 × 1.5–3.5 cm in size. Flowers are rose-colored with dark red spots inside.

References 
 Rehder & E. H. Wilson in Sargent, Pl. Wilson. 1: 528. 1913.
 The Plant List
 Flora of China
 Hirsutum.com

longipes